The following is a list of seasons completed by the Kent State Golden Flashes men's basketball program at Kent State University in Kent, Ohio, United States. The team was established in 1913 and plays at the Division I level of the National Collegiate Athletic Association (NCAA) as members of the Mid-American Conference (MAC) East Division. Kent State played its first intercollegiate game in January 1915 and began play in the MAC in 1951 after playing in the Ohio Athletic Conference (OAC) from 1932–1951. Since 1950, the team has played home games at the Memorial Athletic and Convocation Center. Through the 2017–18 season, the Golden Flashes have won six Mid-American Conference regular-season championships, six MAC tournament titles, and nine MAC East Division titles.  In post-season play, the program has made six appearances in the NCAA tournament, advancing to the Elite Eight in 2002. Additionally, Kent State has nine appearances in the National Invitational Tournament (NIT) and five appearances in the CollegeInsider.com Postseason Tournament (CIT).

Yearly results

References

 
Kent State
Kent State Golden Flashes basketball seasons